The 2019–20 FIS Cross-Country Continental Cup (COC) was a season of the FIS Cross-Country Continental Cup, a series of second-level cross-country skiing competitions arranged by the International Ski Federation (FIS).

The 2019–20 Continental Cup contained nine different series of geographically restricted competitions; five in Europe, two in North America and one each from Asia and Oceania.

Winners
The overall winners from the 2019–20 season's Continental Cups were rewarded a right to start in the first period in the following 2020–21 World Cup season.

References

Sources

 
FIS Cross-Country Continental Cup seasons
2019 in cross-country skiing
2020 in cross-country skiing